Valley Metal Container (VMC), a joint venture between the Coors Brewing Company and American National Can Company, operates the world's largest single-site facility for aluminum can production. Located in Golden, Colorado, the plant manufactures over 4 billion cans per year on six production lines.

External links
Using mixed-integer programming to reduce label changes in the Coors aluminium can plant 
Using Mixed-Integer Programming to Reduce Label Changes in the Coors Aluminum Can Plant 

Joint ventures
Companies based in Golden, Colorado
Packaging companies of the United States